Scutiger chintingensis, also known as the Chinting lazy toad or Chinting alpine toad, is an endangered species of amphibian in the family Megophryidae. It is endemic to the Mount Emei region of Sichuan, China.

Habitat
The Chinting alpine toad breeds in mountain streams at altitudes of 2,700-3,400 m.

Conservation
The species is classified as Endangered by the IUCN because of ongoing habitat loss and rapidly declining population sizes. It is known to be present in the protected areas of the Emeishan Natural and Historical Heritage Reserve, the Wawushan National Forest Park, and the Wolong Nature Reserve.

References

chintingensis
Amphibians of China
Endemic fauna of Sichuan
Taxonomy articles created by Polbot
Amphibians described in 1960